Eriphus is a genus of beetles in the family Cerambycidae, containing the following species:

 Eriphus bahiensis Chevrolat, 1862
 Eriphus bisignatus (Germar, 1824)
 Eriphus cardinalis Monné & Fragoso, 1996
 Eriphus clarkei Tippmann, 1960
 Eriphus dimidiatus White, 1855
 Eriphus haematoderus Chevrolat, 1862
 Eriphus immaculicollis Audinet-Serville, 1834
 Eriphus lineatocollis Chevrolat, 1862
 Eriphus longicollis Zajciw, 1961
 Eriphus metallicus Zajciw, 1960
 Eriphus mexicanus Audinet-Serville, 1834
 Eriphus prolixus Bates, 1872
 Eriphus purpuratus Chevrolat, 1862
 Eriphus rubellus Martins & Galileo, 2004
 Eriphus smaragdinus Monné & Fragoso, 1996
 Eriphus variegatus Monné & Fragoso, 1996
 Eriphus viridis Monné & Fragoso, 1996

References

 
Trachyderini
Cerambycidae genera